Irvington Township is in Washington County, Illinois. As of the 2010 census, its population was 1,285 and it contained 593 housing units. Irvington Township was named for Washington Irving.

Geography

Demographics

References

External links
City-data.com
Illinois State Archives

Townships in Washington County, Illinois
Townships in Illinois